Cérences is a commune in the Manche department in Normandy in north-western France.

International relations

Cérences is twinned with Bere Regis, United Kingdom.

See also
Communes of the Manche department

References

Communes of Manche